The Accidental Getaway Driver is a 2023 American drama film directed by Sing J. Lee, his feature directorial debut and co-written by Lee with Christopher Chen. It is inspired by the 2016 abduction of Long Ma, a Vietnamese American taxi driver in Orange County, by three prison escapees. It stars Hiep Tran Nghia, Phi Vu with Dali Benssalah and Dustin Nguyen.

The Accidental Getaway Driver premiered at the 2023 Sundance Film Festival on January 23, where Lee received the Directing Award in U.S. Dramatic for the film.

Cast 

 Hiep Tran Nghia as Long Ma
 Dustin Nguyen as Tay Duong
 Dali Benssalah as Aden
 Phi Vu as Eddie Ly
 Gabrielle Chan as Lan Ma
 Vivien Ngô as Alice
 Cathy Vu as Hanh
 Tiffany Rothman as Linda
 Sharon Sharth as Concierge
 Travon McCall as News Anchor
 Edward Singletary as Motivational Speaker

Production 
Production began 2022 in California in Little Saigon in Westminster, California.

Release 
It had its world premiere at the 2023 Sundance Film Festival on January 23, 2023.

References

External links 

 

2023 films
2023 independent films
Films about Vietnamese Americans
Films based on newspaper and magazine articles
Films set in Orange County, California